is a mountain in Tsubetsu, Hokkaidō, Japan. It is the source of the Abashiri River. The mountain is made up of non-alkaline mafic volcanic rock 7 million to 1.7 million years old.

References 

Ahoro